Limestone Avenue is a major arterial road in the inner suburbs of Canberra, the capital city of Australia. It links the major junction of Anzac Parade and Fairbairn Avenue outside the Australian War Memorial, passing Merici College, Campbell High School and the Hotel Ainslie. It provides a bypass of the inner city for commuters between Russell Offices, Campbell Park and Canberra Airport and the Inner North. The name Limestone Avenue was gazetted on 25 August 1943 and commemorates Limestone Plains, an early name for the district. It is configured to a dual carriageway standard carrying two traffic lanes in each direction for its entire length.

See also

References

Streets in Canberra